Dunlap is a city in and the county seat of Sequatchie County, Tennessee, United States. The population was 5,357 at the 2020 census and 4,815 at the 2010 census.

Dunlap is part of the Chattanooga, TN–GA Metropolitan Statistical Area.

History

Dunlap was founded in 1858 as a county seat for Sequatchie County, which had been created the previous year.  The city was named for state legislator William Claiborne Dunlap, who played a prominent role in the county's creation.  The city's initial , which were deeded to the county commissioners by Willam Rankin, were chosen due to their central location within the new county.  Dunlap was incorporated as a city in 1941.

Around 1900, the Douglas Coal and Coke Company purchased  of land in the Dunlap vicinity with plans to mine coal and convert the coal into industrial coke.  Coke, which is created by heating coal and removing its volatile matter, is used primarily as a deoxidizing agent in the production of pig iron.  To convert coal mined on nearby Fredonia Mountain into coke, Douglas built the first of 268 ovens.  The company used an incline railway to move the coal from the mountain to the ovens.  Although Douglas went bankrupt in 1904, the Chattanooga Iron and Coal Company purchased the ovens, and continued producing coke until 1927.  In the 1980s and 1990s, the Sequatchie Valley Historical Association acquired the ruins of the coke ovens and established Dunlap Coke Ovens Park.

Geography
Dunlap is located at  (35.377236, -85.388455). The Sequatchie River forms the city's southeastern boundary.

U.S. Route 127 (called "Rankin Avenue" in Dunlap), which traverses much of the Tennessee section of Sequatchie Valley, connects Dunlap to Pikeville and Crossville to the north and Chattanooga opposite Signal Mountain to the southeast. S.R. 28, which intersects with U.S. 127 in Dunlap, connects the city to Jasper to the southwest. S.R. 111, which intersects US 127 a few miles north of Dunlap, connects the city to Chattanooga to the southeast and Spencer atop the plateau to the west.

Demographics

2020 census

As of the 2020 United States census, there were 5,357 people, 2,007 households, and 1,414 families residing in the city.

2000 census
As of the census of 2000, there were 4,173 people, 1,642 households, and 1,182 families residing in the city. The racial makeup of the city was 98.87% White, 0.17% African American, 0.19% Native American, 0.24% Asian, 0.10% from other races, and 0.43% from two or more races. Hispanic or Latino of any race were 0.81% of the population.

There were 1,642 households, out of which 33.5% had children under the age of 18 living with them, 53.6% were married couples living together, 14.3% had a female householder with no husband present, and 28.0% were non-families. 25.3% of all households were made up of individuals, and 10.9% had someone living alone who was 65 years of age or older. The average household size was 2.47 and the average family size was 2.90.

In the city, the population was spread out, with 24.7% under the age of 18, 9.6% from 18 to 24, 28.3% from 25 to 44, 22.9% from 45 to 64, and 14.5% who were 65 years of age or older. The median age was 36 years. For every 100 females, there were 94.8 males. For every 100 females age 18 and over, there were 90.5 males.

The median income for a household in the city was $30,647, and the median income for a family was $34,542. Males had a median income of $26,118 versus $19,952 for females. The per capita income for the city was $17,567. About 18.1% of families and 20.1% of the population were below the poverty line, including 25.5% of those under age 18 and 27.9% of those age 65 or over.

Schools

Sequatchie County has a consolidated school system which is located in Dunlap. The system operates with a superintendent and an elected school board.

The Sequatchie County school system has three schools:

 Griffith Elementary School (Grades: K-4th)
 Sequatchie County Middle School (Grades: 5th-8th)
 Sequatchie County High School (Grades: 9th-12th)

Attractions
Several annual festivals, including a bluegrass festival, are held at the Dunlap Coke Ovens Park every year. Dunlap is often referred to as the "Hang Gliding Capital of the East" and is home to the East Coast Hang Gliding Championships and a hang gliding organization known as the Tennessee Tree Toppers.
The Mount Airy Golf Course is located just north of the city at the Sequatchie-Bledsoe county line. Savage Gulf State Natural Area is located atop the Cumberland Plateau to the west and Prentice Cooper State Forest is located atop the plateau to the east.

Notable people
Raymond H. Cooley (1916–1947) - World War II soldier and Medal of Honor recipient
Dakota Hudson MLB pitcher St. Louis Cardinals
Ray Phelps (1903–1971) - professional baseball player 1930-1936
Tom Stewart (1892–1972) - U.S. Senator and Scopes Trial attorney

References

External links

 Official site
 Sequatchie County and Dunlap Chamber of Commerce
 Municipal Technical Advisory Service entry for Dunlap — information on local government, elections, and link to charter

Cities in Tennessee
Cities in Sequatchie County, Tennessee
County seats in Tennessee
Cities in the Chattanooga metropolitan area
Populated places established in 1858
Coal towns in Tennessee
1858 establishments in Tennessee
Chattanooga metropolitan area county seats